The 2010–11 UNC Asheville Bulldogs men's basketball team represented the University of North Carolina at Asheville during the 2010–11 NCAA Division I men's basketball season. The Bulldogs, led by 15th year head coach Ed Biedenbach, played their home games at the Justice Center and are members of the Big South Conference. They finished the season 20–14, 11–7 in Big South play and were champions of the 2011 Big South Conference men's basketball tournament to earn an automatic bid in the 2011 NCAA Division I men's basketball tournament. They defeated Arkansas–Little Rock in the new First Four round before falling to Pittsburgh in the second round.

Roster

Schedule
 
|-
!colspan=9| Big South Conference Basketball tournament

|-
!colspan=9| NCAA tournament

References

Unc Asheville
Unc Asheville
UNC Asheville Bulldogs men's basketball seasons
UNC Asheville Bulldogs men's basketball team
UNC Asheville Bulldogs men's basketball team